Francisco Manuel "Paco" Soler Atencia (born 5 March 1970) is a Spanish retired footballer who played as a central midfielder, and a manager.

He only played with Mallorca during his career, amassing La Liga totals of 168 matches and three goals over nine seasons and spending 14 years with the first team overall. He subsequently became a coach.

Club career
A hard-nosed player, Soler was born in Palma, Majorca, Balearic Islands, and played his entire career for local club RCD Mallorca. He made his first-team debut in the 1990–91 season, and went on to make 419 overall appearances for them.

In 1996–97, Soler was instrumental in helping Mallorca return to La Liga, and also appeared regularly the following campaign as the team finished fifth. He was named on the substitutes bench for the final of the 1998–99 UEFA Cup Winners' Cup.

In his final two years, however, Soler played almost no part in the side's lineups, and retired after 2003–04 at the age of 34. Subsequently he took up coaching and, in January 2007, was appointed at Portuguese Primeira Liga club S.C. Beira-Mar after it signed a cooperation deal with Inverfutbol, a Spanish-based sporting company, not being able to help the Aveiro team avoid relegation.

In February 2009, Soler returned to his native region, replacing former Spanish international Francisco at the helm of lowly CD Atlético Baleares and suffering another relegation. Four years later, he left his post as director of football and again became their manager.

International career
Soler was part of the Spain squad that won the gold medal at the 1992 Summer Olympics in Barcelona, appearing in four matches for a total of 277 minutes.

Honours

Club
Mallorca
Copa del Rey: 2002–03; Runner-up 1997–98
Supercopa de España: 1998
UEFA Cup Winners' Cup runner-up: 1998–99

International
Spain U23
Summer Olympic Games: 1992

See also
List of one-club men

References

External links

1970 births
Living people
Footballers from Palma de Mallorca
Spanish footballers
Association football midfielders
La Liga players
Segunda División players
Segunda División B players
Tercera División players
RCD Mallorca B players
RCD Mallorca players
Spain under-23 international footballers
Olympic footballers of Spain
Footballers at the 1992 Summer Olympics
Medalists at the 1992 Summer Olympics
Olympic medalists in football
Olympic gold medalists for Spain
Spanish football managers
Segunda División B managers
CD Atlético Baleares managers
Primeira Liga managers
S.C. Beira-Mar managers
Spanish expatriate football managers
Expatriate football managers in Portugal
Spanish expatriate sportspeople in Portugal